Huai Wang (King/Prince Huai or King/Prince of Huai) may refer to:

King Huai of Chu (died 296 BC), ruler of Chu during the Warring States period
Emperor Yi of Chu (died 206 BC), also known as King Huai of Chu, ruler of Chu during the Qin–Han transition
Liu Zun (died 68 BC), ruler of Zhao during the Han dynasty, posthumously known as King Huai of Zhao
Liu Bian (176–190), Han dynasty emperor, posthumously known as Prince Huai of Hongnong
Cao Xuan (Cao Cao's son) (fl. 210s), Cao Wei prince, posthumously known as Prince Huai of Jiyang
Jayaatu Khan Tugh Temür (1304–1332), Yuan dynasty emperor, known as Prince of Huai (懷王) before he became emperor
Zhu Changqing (died 1649), Southern Ming emperor, known as Prince of Huai (淮王) before he became emperor